= Marguerite Poullain =

French merchant (1535–1613)

Marguerite Poullain (1537–1613) was a French merchant, referred to as the richest merchant in Nantes in the 16th century. She was the only woman to be a member of the powerful Nantes merchant association Contractation, and was at one point its only female leader.

She was born to the rich Nantes merchant Julien Poullain, sieur de La Branchoire (d. 1554) and Isabeau Houys, and married in 1557 to the rich Nantes merchant Pierre d'Espinose (d. 1566). She became active in business as a widow.
